Crosswordese is the group of words frequently found in US crossword puzzles but seldom found in everyday conversation.  The words are usually short, three to five letters, with letter combinations which crossword constructors find useful in the creation of crossword puzzles, such as words that start and/or end with vowels, abbreviations consisting entirely of consonants, unusual combinations of letters, and words consisting almost entirely of frequently used letters. Such words are needed in almost every puzzle to some extent. Too much crosswordese in a crossword puzzle is frowned upon by cruciverbalists and crossword enthusiasts.

Knowing the language of "crosswordese" is helpful to constructors and solvers alike.  According to Marc Romano, "to do well solving crosswords, you absolutely need to keep a running mental list of 'crosswordese', the set of recurring words that constructors reach for whenever they are heading for trouble in a particular section of the grid".

The popularity of individual words and names of crosswordese, and the way they are clued, changes over time. For instance, ITO was occasionally clued in the 1980s and 1990s in reference to dancer Michio Itō and actor Robert Ito; then boomed in the late 1990s and 2000s with the rise of judge Lance Ito; and has since fallen somewhat, and when it appears today, the clue typically references figure skater Midori Ito or uses the partial phrase "I to" (as in ["How was ___ know?"]).

List of crosswordese
When applicable, example clues will be denoted in square brackets and answers will be denoted in all caps, e.g. [Example clue] for ANSWER.

Portions of phrases are occasionally used as fill in the blank clues.  For instance, "Et tu, Brute?" might appear in a puzzle's clue sheet as "_, Brute?"

Architecture
 APSE – semicircular church recess
 ELL – type of extension to a building; a measure for cloth
 DORIC and IONIC orders – referring to ancient architecture most readily identifiable by the style of support columns
 NAVE – the middle section of a church
 OGEE – S-shaped curve often seen in Gothic arches
 STOA – covered walkway of ancient Greece

Biblical references
 CAIN and ABEL – sons of Adam and Eve in Genesis 4:1–16
 ENOS – first-born son of Seth
 ESAU – older twin son of Isaac
 EDEN – biblical paradise described in Genesis 2–3 and Ezekiel 28

Brand and trade names
 AFTA – Gillette aftershave brand 
 ATRA – Gillette safety razor brand
 STP – motor oil additive brand
 OREO – snack item known as "Milk's favorite cookie". In the Maleska era, to avoid brand names in the puzzle, it was invariably clued as [Mountain: Comb. form].

Computers and the Internet

 LAN – local area network, network of computers in a limited area
 HTML – the standard language for documents designed to be displayed in a web browser

Currency and business
 EURO – official currency of the European Union
 LEK – official currency of Albania
 LEV – official currency of Bulgaria
 LIRA (plural LIRE) – official currency of Turkey; former currency of Italy
 OPEC – Organization of the Petroleum Exporting Countries
 PESO – official currency of many countries, including Mexico
 ZLOTY – official currency of Poland

Directions

Many puzzles ask for the direction from one place to another.  These directions always fall between the standard octaval compass points—i.e., North (N – 0° or 360°), Northeast (NE – 45°), East (E – 90°), etc.

The directions asked for on clue sheets are usually approximations.  Starting at north and going clockwise, the directions are:
 NNE = North-northeast (22.5°)
 ENE = East-northeast (67.5°)
 ESE = East-southeast (112.5°)
 SSE = South-southeast (157.5°)
 SSW = South-southwest (202.5°)
 WSW = West-southwest (247.5°)
 WNW = West-northwest (292.5°)
 NNW = North-northwest (337.5°)

Fictional characters
 ASTA – dog of Nick and Nora Charles in The Thin Man movies
 AHAB – protagonist of Melville's Moby-Dick
 ANNA – princess from the 2013 film Frozen
 ELSA – princess from the 2013 film Frozen. Also Elsa the lioness or Elsa von Brabant.
 ENOLA – Enola Holmes from the mystery series of the same name
 ENT – treelike species in Middle-earth
 ESMÉ – title character of J. D. Salinger's short story "For Esmé—with Love and Squalor"
 EWOK – furry species in the Star Wars universe
 IAGO – Iago, villain of Shakespeare's Othello; or Iago, parrot in Disney's Aladdin
 ISOLDE – medieval character depicted in Wagner's Tristan und Isolde
 ILSA – Ilsa Lund, Ingrid Bergman's character in Casablanca
 ODIE – dog in the comic strip Garfield
 OPIE – Ron Howard's character on The Andy Griffith Show
 ORC – goblinlike species in Middle-earth
 SMEE – Captain Hook's assistant in Peter Pan
 TOTO – Dorothy's dog in The Wizard of Oz

Food and drink
 AIOLI – condiment similar to mayonnaise, usually with garlic
 GROG – alcoholic beverage made of heated low-alcohol beer, rum and a variety of flavorings such as lemon or lime juice, cinnamon and sugar
 MAHI – Persian (borrowed into Hindi–Urdu) for fish. More often refers to mahi-mahi
 NEHI – line of fruit-flavored soft drinks from the Royal Crown Company.  Grape Nehi was the favorite drink of Radar O'Reilly on the TV series M*A*S*H
 MSG – monosodium glutamate, flavor enhancer; also sometimes clued as an abbreviation for "message" or Madison Square Garden
 OLEO – used as a synonym for margarine
 ORT – scrap of leftover food
 PHO – Vietnamese soup
 POI – mashed taro root dish

Foreign words
 À MOI and À TOI – French for "mine" and "yours" respectively
 AMI or AMIE – French for "friend"
 ANO (more properly AÑO; the tilde is usually ignored) – Spanish for "year"
 AVEC – French for "with"
 BESO – Spanish for "kiss"
 EAU (plural: EAUX) – French for "water"
 ERSE – Scottish Gaelic
 ESA and ESO – Spanish feminine and masculine pronouns
 ESTA and ESTO – Spanish feminine and masculine pronouns
 ÉTAT – French for "state", as in "coup d'état"
 ÉTÉ – French for "summer"
 ÊTRE – French for "to be", as in "raison d'être"
 FRAU – German for "woman", "wife" or "Mrs."
 HERR – German for "Mister (Mr.)"
 ICI – French for "here"
 ÎLE – French for "island", as in "Île-de-France"
 MÁS – Spanish for "more"
 MES – French for "my"; Spanish for "month"
 MLLE and MME – French abbreviations for "Mademoiselle" and "Madame" respectively
 ORO – Spanish for "gold"
 REATA – Spanish for "lasso"
 ROI – French for "king"
 SEL – French for "salt"
 SES – French possessive
 SRA and SRTA – Spanish abbreviations for "señora" and "señorita" respectively
 STE – French abbreviation for "sainte", as in Sault Ste. Marie 
 TES – French possessive
 TÊTE – French for "head", as in "tête-à-tête"
 TÍA and TÍO – Spanish for "aunt" and "uncle" respectively
 UNE – French article

Geography

Proper names 
 AARE (or AAR) – tributary of the Rhine in Switzerland
 ACCRA – capital of Ghana
 ADAK – westerly island of the Aleutian Islands chain
 AGRA – ancient city of India that is the home of the Taj Mahal
 AMES – city of Iowa that is the home of Iowa State University
 APIA – capital of Samoa
 ARAL – lake of Central Asia that has largely dried up by the 2010s
 ARLES – city of southern France where van Gogh painted
 ARNO – river of Italy
 ASTI – city of Italy known for its sparkling wines
 ATTU – westernmost island of the Aleutian Islands chain
 CAEN – World War II battle site in Normandy
 EBRO – river of Spain
 EDER – river of Germany
 ELBE – river of Czechia and Germany
 ELBA – Mediterranean island that was the site of Napoleon's first exile
 ENID – city of Oklahoma
 ERIE – one of the Great Lakes or its namesake city in Pennsylvania
 ESSEN – city of Germany
 IWO – Iwo Jima, World War II battle site in Japan
 NEVA – river of Russia
 ODESSA – city of Ukraine
 OISE – river of France and Belgium
 OJAI – city in southern California
 OMAHA – largest city of Nebraska
 OREM – city near Provo, Utah
 OSLO – capital of Norway
 OUSE – river of Yorkshire, England
 RENO – city of Nevada
 RIGA – capital of Latvia
 SOHO – neighborhood in London (Soho or neighborhood in New York City (SoHo)
 ST. LO – Saint-Lô, World War II battle site in Normandy
 URAL – river and mountain range of Russia
 YSER – river of France and Belgium

General terms
 ARÊTE – thin ridge of rock that formed by glaciers
 MESA – high-elevation area of rock that stands out from its surroundings
 TOR – rock outcrop formed by weathering

Interjections 
 AHEM – used to represent the noise made when clearing the throat
 EGAD – used to express surprise (dated)
 HAHA – used to represent laughter
 HMM – used to express uncertainty
 JEEZ – used to show surprise or annoyance
 PHEW – used to express relief
 PSST – used to attract someone's attention
 WHOA – used to express surprise
 WOWEE (or WOWIE) – used to express astonishment
 YEA – used as an affirmative response

Jargon and slang
 ALEE – in nautical language, toward the side opposite the wind
 ARO – clipping of aromantic
 TEC – old slang for a detective

Language
Because of crossword rules that restrict the usage of two-letter words, only entries of three or more letters have been listed.

Often these letters are clued as puns, e.g. the clue [Puzzle center?] for ZEES, referring to the two Zs in the center of the word "puzzle".

The "zed" spelling of Z is often indicated by a reference to a Commonwealth country, where that is the standard pronunciation (e.g. [British puzzle center?] for ZEDS).

Greek letters often appear as well, such as ETA.

Latin words and phrases
 ET TU – "Et tu, Brute?", the alleged last words spoken by Julius Caesar after being stabbed by his friend Brutus
 HOC – ad hoc, meaning "pertaining to a specific problem"
 IRAE – "Dies irae" ("Day of Wrath"), medieval hymn used in the Roman Catholic Requiem Mass
 VENI, VIDI, VICI – phrase spoken by Julius Caesar meaning "I came, I saw, I conquered"

Manmade items
 ETUI – small purse often used to hold sewing supplies
 EWER – decorative pitcher
 OBI – sash worn with a kimono
 OLIO – miscellaneous mixture of elements, especially artistic works, musical pieces, writing, or food
 OLLA – ceramic stew pot
 ULU – knife traditionally used by Yup'ik, Inuit, and Aleut women

Mathematics 
 RADII – plural of radius, straight line from the centre of a circle to its circumference

Music
 ADAGIO – tempo marking that means "play slowly"
 A DUE – musical direction that means "for two"
 A FLAT (or B FLAT, etc.)
 A MAJOR (or A MINOR, B MAJOR, etc.)
 ARCO – musical direction that means "with the bow"
 ARIA – solo in an opera
 ASSAI – musical direction that means "very"
 A TEMPO – musical direction that means "resume (original) speed"
 LARGO – tempo marking that means "play slowly"
 LEGATO – musical direction that means "play smooth and connected"
 LENTO – tempo marking that means "play very slowly"
 POCO – musical direction modifier that means "somewhat" (literally "a little")
 RIT – abbreviation for "ritardando"
 STAC – abbreviation for "staccato"
 TACET – musical direction to rest

Names

 AGEE – James Agee, American novelist and critic
 ALDA – Alan Alda, American actor who starred in M*A*S*H (1972–1983)
 ALI – Various people, including Muhammad Ali and Ali Baba
 ALOU – Alou family of American baseball players (Felipe, Matty, Jesús, and Moisés)
 AOKI and ISAO – Isao Aoki, Japanese golfer
 ARIE – Arie Luyendyk, Dutch race car driver; or India Arie, American singer
 ARLO – Arlo Guthrie, American folk singer
 AROD – Alex Rodriguez ("A-Rod"), American baseball player
 ARP – Jean Arp, German Dadaist sculptor
 ASCH – Sholem Asch, Polish-American writer in the Yiddish language
 ASHE – Arthur Ashe, American tennis player
 ASNER – Ed Asner, American actor who played Lou Grant
 AUEL – Jean M. Auel, American author of the best-selling Earth's Children series
 AYN – Ayn Rand, American writer and philosopher
 BAER – Max Baer, American boxer
 BARA – Theda Bara, American silent film actress
 CID – El Cid, Castilian soldier of the 11th century
 DENG – Deng Xiaoping, leader of China in the 1980s
 EDA – Eda LeShan, American psychologist and childcare expert
 EDD – Edd Roush, American baseball player
 EDIE – Edie Adams; Edie Falco, American actress who starred on The Sopranos (1999–2007)
 EERO – Eero Saarinen, Finnish-American architect
 ELBA – Idris Elba, English actor
 ELI – Various people, including American football quarterback Eli Manning
 ELIA – pen name for Charles Lamb; Elia Kazan, Greek-born American film and theater director
 ELIE – Elie Wiesel, Holocaust survivor and author of Night (1960)
 ELKE – Elke Sommer, German actress
 ELLA – Ella Fitzgerald, American jazz singe
 ELS – Ernie Els, South African golfer (sometimes refers to the "El" trains of Chicago)
 EMIL – Emil Jannings, winner of the first Academy Award for Best Actor
 ENO – Brian Eno, English musician and record producer
 ENYA – Enya, Irish singer of New Age music
 ERIQ – Eriq La Salle, American actor who starred on ER
 ERLE – Erle Stanley Gardner, American detective author who created Perry Mason
 ERNO – Ernő Rubik, inventor of the Rubik's Cube
 ERROL – Errol Flynn, American actor who played swashbucklers
 ERTE – Erté, Russian-born French graphics and costume designer in the Art Deco style
 ESAI – Esai Morales, American actor of Puerto Rican descent
 ETTA – Etta James, American blues and R&B singer; American singer Etta Jones
 EVERT – Chris Evert, American tennis player
 EWAN – Ewan McGregor, Scottish actor
 EZIO – Ezio Pinza, Italian opera singer
 GENA – Gena Rowlands, American actress
 GERE – Richard Gere, American actor
 GRAF – Steffi Graf, German tennis player
 ILIE – Ilie Năstase, Romanian tennis player
 IM PEI (or just PEI) – I. M. Pei, Chinese-American architect
 INGE – William Inge, American playwright
 ISAK – Isak Dinesen, Danish author
 ISSA – Issa Rae, American actress and writer
 ITALO – Italo Calvino, Italian author
 LON – Lon Chaney, American actor in silent horror films
 MAO – Mao Zedong, first chairman of communist China
 MIRA – Mira Sorvino, American actress
 NERO – Nero, Roman emperor
 NIA – Various people, including American actresses Nia Long, Nia Peeples, and Nia Vardalos
 NIN – Anaïs Nin, French-born diarist and writer of erotica; ANAIS
 ONO – Yoko Ono, Japanese artist and singer
 ORR – Bobby Orr, Canadian ice hockey player
 OTT – Mel Ott, American baseball player
 PELE – Pelé, Brazilian soccer player
 POLA – Pola Negri, Polish silent film actress
 RAE – Various people, including Charlotte Rae, explorer John Rae, Issa Rae, Norma Rae, Corinne Bailey Rae, and Carly Rae Jepsen
 REA – Stephen Rea, Irish actor who starred in The Crying Game (1992)
 SELA – Sela Ward, American actress
 SELES – Monica Seles, Swiss tennis player
 SOSA – Sammy Sosa, Dominican-American baseball player
 TATI – Jacques Tati, French mime and filmmaker
 TERI – Various people, including American actresses Teri Garr, Teri Hatcher, and Teri Polo
 TRIS – Tris Speaker, American baseball player
 UMA – Uma Thurman, American actress who starred in Pulp Fiction (1994) and Kill Bill (2003)
 U NU – U Nu, first prime minister of Burma
 UTA – Uta Hagen, American actress and acting teacher
 URI – Uri Geller, Israeli magician
 URIS – Leon Uris, American author
 YAO – Yao Ming, Chinese basketball player
 YMA – Yma Sumac, Peruvian singer
 YUL – Yul Brynner, Russian-born American actor who starred in The King and I

Nature 
 ACAI – Amazonian palm fruit
 AERIE – high nest of a bird of prey
 AGAVE – spiky succulent plant of the desert used to make tequila
 ALOE – succulent plant. Often refers to Aloe vera, a common cosmetic ingredient and sunburn-relieving gel
 ANIL – plant used to make indigo dye
 ASH – common tree
 ASP – Egyptian snake
 ASTER – flower whose name means "star"
 AUK – common seabird
 AWN – bristle on some grasses
 BOA – type of snake
 BOSC – type of pear
 CALLA – kind of lily
 EFT – juvenile phase of the newt
 EIDER – kind of duck used for their down feathers
 ELAND – African antelope
 ELK – large deer
 EMU – large flightless bird of Australia
 ERNE (or ERN) – sea eagle
 GNU – another name for the wildebeest
 IBEX – goat living in mountains
 IBIS – wading bird that was venerated in ancient Egypt
 IRIS – common flower
 MOA – extinct bird of New Zealand
 NENE – goose endemic to Hawaii (and its state bird)
 OCA – tuber of South America
 OKAPI – relative of the giraffe
 OKRA – pod vegetable used in gumbo
 ORCA – another name for the killer whale
 RHEA – large flightless bird of South America (sometimes refers to Rhea Perlman or the goddess Rhea)
 SEDGE – family of grassy marsh plants
 SEGO – kind of lily (state flower of Utah)
 SEPAL – flower part that supports the petals
 SLOE – fruit plant used to make a type of gin
 SMEW – kind of duck
 TARO – root vegetable used in poi
 TERN – common seabird
 TIT – common bird related to the chickadee
 TSETSE – disease-carrying insect of Africa
 UDO – Japanese herb
 UGLI – Jamaican citrus fruit

Poetic phrases and terms 
 E'EN – contraction of "even"
 E'ER – poetic contraction of "ever"
 ERIN – poetic name for Ireland
 O'ER – contraction of "over"

Prefixes 
 AERO- – relating to flight and air
 PYRO- – relating to fire and heat

Suffixes
 -ASE – a suffix used to form the names of enzymes
 -ISM – indicating a belief or principle
 -IST – indicating an adherent to a belief or principle
 -ITE – a suffix with several meanings, including a faithful follower of a certain person, a mineral, and a native of a certain place
 -OSE – a suffix in chemistry indicating sugar or "full of"
 -ULE – a suffix meaning small

Religion and mythology
 AJAX – Greek hero (or Ajax, cleaning brand)
 AMUN-RA (also AMON-RA or AMEN-RA)
 ARES – Greek god of war, one of the twelve Olympians
 EID – Eid al-Fitr or Eid al-Adha, Islamic holidays (literally Arabic for "festival")
 EOS – Greek goddess of the dawn (or Canon EOS cameras)
 ERATO – Greek muse of poetry
 EROS – Greek god of love
 HAJJ – the pilgrimage every faithful Muslim is obliged to perform; one of the Five Pillars of Islam. Sometimes spelled HADJ.
 HERA – Greek goddess, sister and wife of Zeus
 LEDA – queen in Greek mythology, part of "Leda and the Swan"
 MEDEA – Greek figure who helped Jason
 NIOBE – weeping Greek figure
 NOEL – Christmas
 ROC – giant bird of Middle Eastern mythology
 SATYR – half-man, half-goat of Greek mythology
 TET – Tết Nguyên Đán, the Vietnamese New Year

Roman numerals
Many puzzles ask for Roman numerals either as answers or as portions of answers.  For instance:
 a puzzle might ask for the solution of 1916 − 1662 as "MCMXVI minus MDCLXII."  The answer (254) would be written as CCLIV.
 LEOIV is the answer to a clue about Pope Leo IV.
 a puzzle might ask which Super Bowl was the first to be played in Tampa, Florida.  The answer is XVIII.

Standard Roman numerals run from 1 to 3999, or I to MMMCMXCIX.  The first ten Roman numerals are:

The following table shows the numerals used in crossword puzzles.

Science

 OZONE – a pale-blue, inorganic molecule
 XENON – a colourless noble gas with symbol 'Xe' and atomic-number '54'

Sports and gaming
 ALAI – jai alai, game played in a court with a ball and a wickerwork racket
 ALEAST, ALWEST, ALER – American League East/West and a baseball player in the AL ("AL'er")
 AT BAT – baseball batter's turn at the plate
 ANTE – forced bet in poker
 BAMA – University of Alabama Crimson Tide
 ÉPÉE – modern fencing sword
 ERA – earned run average
 ESPY – ESPY Awards; also sometimes clued as the verb "espy", meaning "catch a glimpse of"
 Nicknames based on nicknames
 BOSOX (or just SOX) – Boston Red Sox
 BUCS – Tampa Bay Buccaneers
 CAPS – Washington Capitals
 CAVS – Cleveland Cavaliers or University of Virginia Cavaliers
 HABS – Montreal Canadiens
 JAGS – Jacksonville Jaguars
 MAVS – Dallas Mavericks
 NATS – Washington Nationals
 PATS – New England Patriots
 VIKES – Minnesota Vikings
 VOLS – University of Tennessee Volunteers
 NLEAST, NLWEST, NLER – National League East/West and a baseball player in the NL ("NL'er")
 RBI (plural: RBIs) – run batted in
 SAC – baseball clipping of "sacrifice", as in sac fly or sac bunt
 TKO – a boxing term meaning "technical knockout"; plural is "TKOs"
 Three-letter scoreboard abbreviations of major league teams
 ANA – Anaheim Ducks
 ARI (or ARZ) – Arizona Cardinals, Coyotes and Diamondbacks
 ATL – Atlanta Braves, Falcons and Hawks
 BAL – Baltimore Orioles and Ravens
 BKN – Brooklyn Nets
 BOS – Boston Bruins, Celtics and Red Sox
 BUF – Buffalo Bills and Sabres
 CAR – Carolina Hurricanes and Panthers
 CGY – Calgary Flames and Stampeders
 CHA – Charlotte Hornets (formerly Bobcats)
 CHC – Chicago Cubs
 CHI – Chicago Bears, Blackhawks and Bulls
 CHW (or CWS) – Chicago White Sox
 CIN – Cincinnati Bengals and Reds
 CLE – Cleveland Browns, Cavaliers and Guardians
 COL – Colorado Avalanche and Rockies
 DAL – Dallas Cowboys, Mavericks and Stars
 DEN – Denver Broncos and Nuggets
 DET – Detroit Lions, Pistons, Red Wings and Tigers
 EDM – Edmonton Elks and Oilers
 FLA – Florida Panthers
 GSW – Golden State Warriors
 HOU – Houston Astros, Rockets and Texans  (also, formerly, Oilers)
 IND – Indianapolis Colts and Indiana Pacers
 JAC (or JAX) – Jacksonville Jaguars
 LAA – Los Angeles Angels
 LAC – Los Angeles Chargers and Clippers
 LAD – Los Angeles Dodgers
 LAK – Los Angeles Kings
 LAL – Los Angeles Lakers
 LAR – Los Angeles Rams
 MEM – Memphis Grizzlies
 MIA – Miami Dolphins, Heat and Marlins
 MIL – Milwaukee Brewers and Bucks
 MIN – Minnesota Timberwolves, Twins, Vikings and Wild
 MTL – Montreal Alouettes and Canadiens (also, formerly, Expos)
 NAS (or NSH) – Nashville Predators
 NOP – New Orleans Pelicans
 NYG – New York Giants
 NYI – New York Islanders
 NYJ – New York Jets
 NYK – New York Knicks
 NYM – New York Mets
 NYR – New York Rangers
 NYY – New York Yankees
 OAK – Oakland Athletics (also, formerly, Raiders)
 OKC – Oklahoma City Thunder
 ORL – Orlando Magic
 OTT – Ottawa Senators
 PHI – Philadelphia Eagles, Flyers, Phillies and 76ers
 PHO (or PHX) – Phoenix Suns
 PIT – Pittsburgh Penguins, Pirates and Steelers
 POR – Portland Trail Blazers
 SAC – Sacramento Kings
 SAS – San Antonio Spurs
 SEA – Seattle Kraken, Mariners and Seahawks (also, formerly, SuperSonics)
 STL – St. Louis Blues and Cardinals (also, formerly, Cardinals (NFL) and Rams)
 TBL – Tampa Bay Lightning
 TEN – Tennessee Titans
 TEX – Texas Rangers
 TOR – Toronto Argonauts, Blue Jays, Maple Leafs and Raptors
 UTA – Utah Jazz
 VAN – Vancouver Canucks
 WAS (or WSH) – Washington Capitals, Commanders (formerly Redskins), Nationals, and Wizards

Titles of books, plays, movies, etc.
 AIDA – 1871 opera by Verdi set in ancient Egypt or the Elton John musical adaptation
 "ERI TU" – aria from Verdi's Un ballo in maschera
 OED – Oxford English Dictionary
 OMOO – 1847 novel by Herman Melville
 OTELLO – 1887 opera by Verdi based on Shakespeare's Othello
 R.U.R. 1920 play by Karel Čapek that popularized the word "robot"
 TOSCA – 1900 opera by Puccini
 TYPEE – 1846 novel by Melville

Titles used by royalty and the nobility
 AGA (or AGHA) – Turkish honorific for a high-level government official
 BEY – the governor of a district or province in the Ottoman Empire
 EMIR – a title given to princes and/or sheikhs who rule certain Arab countries; formerly, alternative spellings included AMIR, AMEER, and EMEER
 PASHA
 RAJA (or RAJAH) and RANI (or RANEE) – former Indian monarch and wife (often clued as a princess)

Transportation
 ALERO – last Oldsmobile model
 ALFA – short for Alfa Romeo, Italian carmaker
 AUDI – German carmaker
 AVEO – Chevrolet subcompact
 BART – abbreviated name of the Bay Area Rapid Transit, the subway system that serves the San Francisco Bay Area
 EDSEL – Ford model that famously flopped
 GEO – line of compact cars sold by Chevrolet dealers, based on cars manufactured by Toyota and Suzuki
 GTI – abbreviation of Grand Tourer Injection, used on many sporty European and Japanese cars, most notably the Volkswagen Golf GTI
 GTO – abbreviation of the Italian term Gran Turismo Omologato, most notably used on the Pontiac GTO
 IROC (or IROC-Z) – racing organization or its namesake type of Chevrolet Camaro
 IRT – abbreviated name of the Interborough Rapid Transit Company which used to operate a portion of the New York City subway system
 MARTA – abbreviated name of the Metropolitan Atlanta Rapid Transit Authority, the subway system that serves the Atlanta metropolitan area
 OPEL – German carmaker
 REO Motor Car Company – American carmaker founded by Ransom E. Olds; one of its models inspired the band name REO Speedwagon
 XK-E – Jaguar model

U.S. states and Canadian provinces
 Postal abbreviations:  Since the late 1970s, the post offices in the United States and Canada have used computerized letter sorting.  This prompted the creation of the two-capital-letter abbreviations used today for all states and most provinces (i.e., "MN" for Minnesota and "QC" for Quebec).  Previously, when mail was sorted by hand, many states and provinces had abbreviations of three to five letters.  Many of these longer abbreviations are now part of crosswordese.  (Notes:  (1) Except for Texas, states with four- or five-letter names were generally spelled out.  (2) Other states and provinces not shown below had the same two-letter abbreviations that are still used today.)
 ALA – Alabama
 ALB – Alberta
 ARIZ – Arizona
 ARK – Arkansas
 CALIF – California (also, unofficially, CAL or, colloquially, CALI)
 COLO – Colorado
 CONN – Connecticut
 DEL – Delaware
 FLA – Florida
 IDA – Idaho (unofficial)
 ILL – Illinois
 IND – Indiana
 KANS – Kansas (also, unofficially, KAN)
 MICH – Michigan
 MINN – Minnesota
 MISS – Mississippi
 MONT – Montana
 NEB – Nebraska
 NEV – Nevada
 NMEX – New Mexico
 NCAR – North Carolina (unofficial)
 NDAK – North Dakota
 NWT – Northwest Territories
 OLKA – Oklahoma
 OREG – Oregon (also, unofficially, ORE)
 ONT – Ontario
 PEI – Prince Edward Island
 PENN – Pennsylvania (unofficial)
 QUE – Quebec
 SASK – Saskatchewan
 SCAR – South Carolina (unofficial)
 SDAK – South Dakota
 TENN – Tennessee
 TEX – Texas
 WASH – Washington
 WVA – West Virginia
 WIS – Wisconsin (also, unofficially, WISC)
 WYO – Wyoming

Weaponry and warfare
 ENOLA – Enola Gay, airplane that dropped the first atomic bomb
 ETO – European Theater of Operations
 SNEE – obsolete term for a dagger ("[Snick's partner]")

Miscellaneous crosswordese

 ALAMO – mission in San Antonio, Texas, where the Battle of the Alamo took place
 ARA – constellation of the Southern Hemisphere
 ECRU – pale color similar to beige; from French écru, meaning "raw, unbleached"
 LAIC – of the laity (non-clergy)
 NÉE – designates woman's surname before marriage; literally French for "born"
 ORE – rock mined for metal
 OTOE – indigenous people of what is now Nebraska, also OTO
 SCALA – La Scala, opera house in Milan, Italy
 UTE – indigenous people of what is now Utah

Outdated crosswordese
These once-common terms are especially rare or never found in new puzzles.
 ANOA – buffalo of Indonesia
 INEE – type of arrow poison used by native South Americans
 SLA – Symbionese Liberation Army, 1970s radical group known for kidnapping Patty Hearst

References

Works cited
 

Crosswords